Nikephoros Komnenos (– after 1136) was a Byzantine aristocrat and high official. The youngest brother of Emperor Alexios I Komnenos, he was appointed second-in-command of the Byzantine navy, but his life is otherwise obscure.

Life
He was the fifth son and last child of John Komnenos and Anna Dalassene, and thus the youngest brother of Emperor Alexios I Komnenos. According to Nikephoros Bryennios the Younger, when Alexios and his older brothers entered military service, Nikephoros and his fourth brother, Adrianos, remained with their mother, who ensured that they received a thorough, encyclopedic education.

When Alexios came to the throne, he raised his relatives to high dignities, often newly created ones: thus Nikephoros was titled a sebastos, and given the office of megas droungarios of the fleet. The holder of this office was the second-in-command of the Byzantine navy after the megas doux, but Nikephoros is not recorded as having ever held an active command. Thus either Nikephoros lost his appointment, or several megaloi droungarioi existed at once, with Nikephoros' post being merely honorary.

His life is likewise extremely obscure; for this reason, Basile Skoulatos calls him "the least-known member of the Komnenos family". He is only once mentioned in the Alexiad, and is not recorded as having played any role during the reign of Alexios, nor during that of Alexios' son and successor John II Komnenos, except for a reference to a megas droungarios Nikephoros as one of the witnesses of the typikon of the Pantokrator Monastery, written in 1136. It is unclear to what this exceptional silence of the sources is due; Konstantinos Varzos suggested that he might have fallen into disfavour as one possible reason. It is also not entirely certain whether the Nikephoros of 1136 is the same as Alexios' brother: only the title of megas droungarios is given, without any family connection or surname, and even the title is ambiguous, as it could be applied to both the megas droungarios of the fleet as to the megas droungarios tes viglas.

Family
He married a lady of unknown name and family, and had at least two children: a daughter, who married Gregory Pakourianos the Younger, and a son, the sebastos Alexios, whose life is otherwise unknown.

References

Sources
 
 
 

1060s births
1130s deaths
11th-century Byzantine people
12th-century Byzantine people
Family of Alexios I Komnenos
Byzantine admirals
Nikephoros
Sebastoi